Kingsley Tissa Wickramaratne was the 5th Governor of Southern Province, Sri Lanka. Wickramaratne held the position from 1 February 2002, through 23 October 2006, when he was replaced by Kumari Balasuriya.

References

External links
Sri Lankan Provinces from 1988

Governors of Southern Province, Sri Lanka
Living people
Year of birth missing (living people)